New York What Is Funky is an compilation album by the Ultramagnetic MCs. Ced Gee supplied the tracks to Tuff City. These tracks were recorded from '90-'94 recording sessions. "Chuck Chillout" is a tribute to DJ Chuck Chillout.

Track listing
"Grip the Mic"
"New York What Is Funky"
"Black Potions"
(untitled)
"Here I Go Again"
"I'm Fuckin' Flippin'"
"Biscuits and Eggs"
"Chuck Chillout"
"Poo Poo Wreckers"
"Catchin' Bodies"
"Tim Dog Live on Capitol Radio"
"Join the Party"
"I Like Your Style"
"I Ain't Takin' No Shorts"

References

Ultramagnetic MCs albums
1996 albums